Roberto Santo (born 7 March 1986) is a South African football midfielder who plays for National First Division club Vasco da Gama.

References

1986 births
South African soccer players
Living people
Cape Town Spurs F.C. players
White South African people
South African people of Portuguese descent
Vasco da Gama (South Africa) players
Association football wingers